Lewis may refer to:

Names
 Lewis (given name), including a list of people with the given name
 Lewis (surname), including a list of people with the surname

Music
 Lewis (musician), Canadian singer
 "Lewis (Mistreated)", a song by Radiohead from My Iron Lung

Places
 Lewis (crater), a crater on the far side of the Moon
 Isle of Lewis, the northern part of Lewis and Harris, Western Isles, Scotland

United States
 Lewis, Colorado
 Lewis, Indiana
 Lewis, Iowa
 Lewis, Kansas
 Lewis Wharf, Boston, Massachusetts
 Lewis, Missouri
 Lewis, Essex County, New York
 Lewis, Lewis County, New York
 Lewis, North Carolina
 Lewis, Vermont
 Lewis, Wisconsin

Ships
 USS Lewis (1861), a sailing ship
 USS Lewis (DE-535), a destroyer escort in commission from 1944 to 1946

Science
 Lewis structure, a diagram of a molecule that shows the bonding between the atoms
 Lewis acids and bases
 Lewis antigen system, a human blood group system
 Lewis number, a dimensionless number in fluid dynamics and transport phenomena
 Lewis rat, an inbred strain of laboratory rat

Television
 Lewis (TV series), a British television detective series
 Lewis (The Simpsons), a character in The Simpsons

Other uses
 Lewis (cat), a cat that was placed under house arrest
 Lewis (lifting appliance)
 Lewis (robot), a robotic wedding photographer
 Lewis (satellite), a failed NASA satellite mission
 HP Lewis, a CPU in certain Hewlett-Packard programmable calculators
 Lewis's, a chain of department stores in England and Scotland (1856-1990s), originating in Liverpool
 Lewis & Co, a firm of organ builders in Brixton, London from 1860 to 1919
 Lewis University, a private school in Romeoville, Illinois

See also
 Fort Lewis, Washington
 John Lewis & Partners, a department store in Great Britain
 John Lewis Partnership, an employee-owned UK company which operates John Lewis and Waitrose
 Justice Lewis (disambiguation)
 Lewes (disambiguation)
 Lewis and Clark-class dry cargo ship, a class of vessels
 Lewis and Harris, the largest island in Scotland
 Lewis Bridge (disambiguation)
 Lewis chessmen, medieval chess pieces discovered on the Isle of Lewis
 Lewis County (disambiguation)
 Lewis gun, a machine gun 
 Lewis Island (disambiguation)
 Lewis River (disambiguation)
 Lewis Township (disambiguation)
 Lewis Township, Pennsylvania (disambiguation)
 Lewisburg (disambiguation)
 Lewisite
 Lewiston (disambiguation)
 Lewistown (disambiguation)
 Lewisville (disambiguation)
 Louis (disambiguation)
 Louise (disambiguation)
 Luas
 Luis (disambiguation)
 SS Lewis Hamilton, former name of the Indus
 USNS Lewis and Clark (T-AKE-1), a United States Navy dry cargo ship
 USS Lewis and Clark (SSBN-644), a United States Navy ballistic missile submarine
 USS Milton Lewis (DE-772), a United States Navy destroyer escort